"The Ties That Bind" is the sixth episode of the fourth series of the 1990s British comedy television series Jeeves and Wooster. It is also called "The Ex's Are Nearly Married Off".

In the US, it was aired as the fourth episode of the third series of Jeeves and Wooster on Masterpiece Theatre, on 31 October 1993.

Background 
Adapted from Much Obliged, Jeeves.

Cast
 Bertie Wooster – Hugh Laurie
 Jeeves – Stephen Fry
 Aunt Agatha – Elizabeth Spriggs
 Roderick Spode – John Turner
 Sir Watkyn – John Woodnutt
 Tuppy Glossop – Robert Daws
 Madeline Bassett – Elizabeth Morton
 Florence Craye – Francesca Folan
 Ginger Winship – Julian Gartside
 Brinkley – Fred Evans
 Mrs McCorkadale – Selina Cadell
 Constable Oates – Sidney Livingstone
 Magnolia – Fiona Christie
 Butterfield – Preston Lockwood

Plot
Bertie's friend Ginger Winship is engaged to Florence Craye, who is making Ginger stand for Parliament. Ex-valet Brinkley hopes to sell confidential information about Ginger to his opponent in the election. Meanwhile, Tuppy Glossop hopes to make a fortune running "Plumbo Jumbo", a plumbing machine that unblocks pipes.

See also
 List of Jeeves and Wooster characters

References

External links

Jeeves and Wooster episodes
1993 British television episodes